Iurie Țurcanu (born 21 June 1973) is a Moldovan politician.

Biography
Iurie Țurcanu was born on 21 June 1973 in Corlăteni, in the Rîșcani District. He was the first Deputy Prime Minister for Digitalization of Moldova. This post was created on 6 August 2021 and is responsible for coordinating the activities of three Moldovan institutions: the E-Governance Agency, the Public Services Agency and the Information Technology and Cyber Security Service. In September 2021, Țurcanu represented Moldova at the international conference Connecting Municipalities in Digital Era: Best practices from the EU and talked about the problems and objectives of Moldova in the digital realm. Later, in December 2021, Țurcanu said that, during the tenure of the Gavrilița Cabinet, it is possible that Moldovans could start to engage on electronic voting, although he did not give guarantees for members of the Moldovan diaspora.

References

1973 births
Living people
21st-century Moldovan politicians
Government ministers of Moldova